is a Japanese film director and screenwriter.

Career
Furusawa began making 8mm films in college, and won the scriptwriting award for his film home sweet movie at the 1997 Pia Film Festival. He enrolled at the Film School of Tokyo in 1997. After graduating, he worked as a director's assistant for Kiyoshi Kurosawa, Shinji Aoyama, and Takahisa Zeze, and penned the scripts for Zeze's Chōgokudō and Kurosawa's Doppelganger. He made his major feature length directorial debut with Ghost Train in 2006.

Selected filmography

References

External links 

1972 births
Living people
Japanese film directors
Japanese screenwriters